Fruit Loops or Froot Loops may refer to:

 Froot Loops, a brand of cereal
 FruityLoops, a software music mixer
 Fruit Loops (also known as Freedom Rings), multicolored rings worn as necklaces, bracelets, etc. to symbolize gay pride
 , various slang definitions